Aaron Leventhal is a retired American soccer player who played professionally in the USL A-League.

Leventhal attended Drake University, playing on the men’s soccer team from 1992 to 1995.  He is within the top ten of all Drake offensive records.  In 1995, Leventhal played for the Des Moines Menace in the USISL Premier League.  He led the team in scoring as it went to the Sizzlin’ Four Tournament.  In 1996, Leventhal turned professional with the Minnesota Thunder of the 1996 USISL Select League.  In 1997, the Thunder moved to the USISL A-League.  In 1999, they won the A-League championship.  Leventhal retired after playing one game at the beginning of the 2002 season.

In May 2006, Levanthal became the strength and conditioning coach for the Minnesota Thunder.  He is part of Team Gilboa, an Alpine ski club.  He was American Alpine skier Kristina Koznick’s strength and condition coach.

External links
 Dallas Sidekicks: Corey Hooper

References

Living people
1974 births
American soccer players
Des Moines Menace players
Drake Bulldogs men's soccer players
Minnesota Thunder players
USL League Two players
USISL Select League players
A-League (1995–2004) players
Association football defenders
Association football midfielders